Danganronpa Another Episode: Ultra Despair Girls is an action-adventure video game developed by Spike Chunsoft for PlayStation Vita. The game is the first spin-off of the Danganronpa series of visual novel games, set between the events of Danganronpa: Trigger Happy Havoc and Danganronpa 2: Goodbye Despair. The game was released in Japan on September 25, 2014, and was released by NIS America in North America on September 1, 2015, in Europe on September 4, 2015, and in Australia on September 10, 2015. The game was released on PlayStation 4 and Windows worldwide in 2017.

Gameplay 

Unlike the visual novel gameplay of the previous games, Ultra Despair Girls is a third-person adventure game with horror elements, in which players control Komaru Naegi as she tries to survive in a city overrun by Monokuma robots. Komaru is armed with a megaphone-shaped Hacking Gun that can use various types of Truth Bullets, which are unlocked as the game progresses. Using the Hacking Gun, Komaru can perform various actions, such as attacking enemies, taking control of them, activating certain machinery, or scanning the environment for clues or hidden items.

During the course of the game, Komaru is also assisted by the first game's Toko Fukawa, who uses a stun gun to switch over to her split personality, the serial killer Genocide Jill. When the stun gun is charged up, players can temporarily take control of Jill, who can attack with razor sharp scissors. Attacking enemies fills up the "Scissor Fever" gauge, allowing Jill to perform special attacks to instantly defeat multiple enemies. Monocoins earned from defeating enemies can be used to purchase upgrades for both Komaru's Hacking Gun and Jill's scissors, and various skills can be unlocked and equipped, such as extended health. The game features three difficulty settings, with harder difficulties containing less ammunition and fewer opportunities to use Jill's assistance.

Plot

The game takes place half a year after the events of the first game, prior to the events of the second game. Komaru Naegi, the younger sister of the first game's protagonist, Makoto Naegi, has spent the past year locked inside an apartment complex in Towa City, unaware of the events that have gone on in the outside world. She is suddenly forced to flee when she was attacked by deadly Monokuma robots and comes across Future Foundation member Byakuya Togami, who gives Komaru a special Hacking Gun that can fight against the robots and orders her to escape the city. However, Komaru's escape fails and she is captured by a group of elementary-school children known as the Warriors of Hope, who seek to create a utopia for children by murdering all the adults with their robots. They force Komaru to join their "Demon Hunting" game and drop her into the city, where she is saved by homicidal maniac Genocide Jill, who soon reverts to her true self, Toko Fukawa, a survivor of Hopes Peak High School's killing game. Toko can now control Jill through the use of a stun gun. Learning that Byakuya may have been kidnapped by the Warriors of Hope, Toko agrees to team up with Komaru to find Byakuya and escape the city. Along the way they encounter a resistance group, run by Haiji Towa, and meet a white bear robot named Shirokuma.

As Komaru and Toko go on their journey, fighting against the Warriors of Hope and encountering much despair along the way, they learn that the Warriors of Hope are in worship of Junko Enoshima, the Ultimate Despair responsible for bringing about the end of the world, and seek to create a successor. Confronting the group's leader, Monaca Towa, and defeating their advisor Kurokuma, Komaru is given the choice of destroying the Monokuma Controller, which would stop all the robots but at the cost of sacrificing all the children wearing Monokuma Kid masks. Monaca then reveals that her goal is to turn Komaru into the next Junko Enoshima, trying to coerce her into destroying the controller by allegedly revealing her parents were personally killed by her. However, Toko, having learned a great deal from travelling with Komaru, slaps some sense into her and together they overcome despair in order to defeat an out-of-control mech. After rescuing Byakuya, Komaru and Toko decide to stay behind in Towa City to help out those who need it. Meanwhile, as Monaca is inevitably rescued by the Servant, who encourages her to become the next Junko herself, it is revealed that both Shirokuma and Kurokuma were controlled by copies of the real Junko's AI, who has Izuru Kamukura carry out the next part of her plan.

However, if Komaru chooses to destroy the controller before learning its true purpose, the Bad Ending is triggered and all of the Monokuma Kids are killed as their masks explode. Komaru becomes the hero of the resistance, but she feels extremely guilty for what she has done.

Development and release
With the two previous entries in the Danganronpa series being visual novel adventure games, members of Spike Chunsoft wanted to develop a spin-off game that was more action oriented. One of the proponents for a spin-off game was series writer Kazutaka Kodaka; he had wanted to write a story of two characters running away from despair, and he felt that the easiest way to do this was through an action game that necessitated movement. When Spike Chunsoft green-lit the proposal, they let Kodaka have free rein to write the narrative for Danganronpa Another Episode: Ultra Despair Girls. Kodaka stated that he spent an equal amount of time writing the dialogue and backstories for the protagonists (originally developed for Danganronpa: Trigger Happy Havoc) as he did for the antagonists. One aspect of Danganronpa Another Episode: Ultra Despair Girls that the development team was worried about was whether the shift in gameplay genres would alienate players who were not good at action games. They decided to add the mechanic of switching between characters, as Genocide Jill would make the game significantly easier.

Danganronpa Another Episode: Ultra Despair Girls was announced at a Sony Computer Entertainment press conference in September 2013, where the first gameplay trailer was shown; the trailer also teased the third entry in the series. It was then released in Japan on September 25, 2014. To promote the game, Spike Chunsoft offered several pre-order bonuses, including digital wallpapers, mousepads, and a smartphone stand. Additional merchandise such as Monokuma stuffed toys and an armband were also offered at Comiket. NIS America localized and published the international versions of the game. It was released in North America on September 1, 2015, in Europe on September 4, and in Australia on September 10. NIS America offered a limited edition of the game, which included a concept art book, the game's soundtrack, and other collector's items. NIS America released the game for PlayStation 4 in North America and Europe in Summer 2017.

Other media 
The game has received two manga adaptations. A manga by Machika Minami, titled Zettai Zetsubō Shōjo: Danganronpa Another Episode: Genocider Mode, began serialization in Kadokawa Shoten's Dengeki Maoh magazine from January 2015. A second manga by Hajime Toya debuted in Kadokawa Shoten's Famitsu Comic Clear magazine in February 2015, and was serialized until July 2017. Two comic anthologies by various artists were released on January 24, 2015, and May 25, 2015, respectively. This game will not be included in Danganronpa Decadence.

A Danganronpa Another Episode: Ultra Despair Girls mobile app featuring Komaru was released for Android in Japan in August 2015. The app allows users to manage their smartphone files and cache, and Komaru's expression will change depending on the amount of storage used.

Reception

Danganronpa Another Episode: Ultra Despair Girls received "mixed or average" reviews from critics. At Metacritic, which assigns a normalised rating out of 100 to reviews from mainstream publications, the game received an average score of 72, based on 35 reviews. The game sold a total of 70,596 copies on the PlayStation Vita during its first week on sale in Japan and was the third best-selling game of the week. The PS4 version sold a total of 1,810 copies during its first week on sale in Japan and failed to reach the sales charts. The Steam release had an estimated total of 32,000 players by July 2018.

The game has sold a total of 128,559 copies in Japan (PS Vita: 123,278 copies/PS4: 5,281 copies).

Notes

References

External links 

2014 video games
Action-adventure games
Danganronpa video games
Nippon Ichi Software games
Child abuse in fiction
Organized crime video games
PlayStation Vita games
PlayStation 4 games
Seinen manga
Shōnen manga
Single-player video games
Spike Chunsoft video games
Splatterpunk
Video game spin-offs
Video games developed in Japan
Video games featuring female protagonists
Video games scored by Masafumi Takada
Violence in video games
Windows games
Domestic violence in fiction
Discrimination in fiction
Mass murder in fiction
Fiction about murder
Works about rape
Works about sexual abuse
Works about sexual harassment
Works about torture